A total of 34 teams entered the qualification rounds of the 1950 FIFA World Cup, competing for a total of 16 spots in the final tournament. Brazil, as the hosts, and Italy, as the defending champions, qualified automatically, leaving 14 spots open for competition.

The remaining 32 teams were divided into 10 groups, based on geographical considerations, as follows:
Groups 1 to 6 – Europe: 7 places, contested by 18 teams (including Israel and Syria).
Groups 7 to 9 – The Americas: 6 places, contested by 10 teams.
Group 10 – Asia: 1 place, contested by 4 teams.
However, due to the withdrawals of India, Scotland and Turkey after qualifying, only 13 teams actually competed in the final tournament.

A total of 19 teams played at least one qualifying match. A total of 26 qualifying matches were played, and 121 goals were scored (an average of 4.65 per match).

Listed below are the dates and results of the qualification rounds.

Groups 
The 10 groups had different rules, as follows:
Group 1 had 4 teams. The teams played against each other once. The group winner and runner-up would qualify.
Groups 2, 3 and 4 had 3 teams each. The strongest team of each group was seeded. There would be two rounds of play:
 First Round: The seeded team received a bye and advanced to final round directly. The 2 unseeded teams played against each other on a home-and-away basis. The winner would advance to final round. 
 Final Round: The seeded team played against the winner of the First Round on a home-and-away basis. The winner would qualify.
Group 5 had 3 teams. The teams played against each other on a home-and-away basis. The group winner would qualify.
Group 6 had 2 teams. The teams played against each other on a home-and-away basis. The group winner would qualify.
Group 7 had 3 teams. The group winner and runner-up would qualify.
Group 8 had 4 teams. The group winner and runner-up would qualify.
Group 9 had 3 teams. The teams played against each other twice. The group winner and runner-up would qualify.
Group 10 had 4 teams. The group winner would qualify.

Group 1 

England qualified. Scotland also qualified, but declined to participate.

Group 2

First round 

Syria withdrew, and remaining match was not played.

Turkey advanced to the Final Round.

Final round 

Austria withdrew, so Turkey qualified automatically. But Turkey later also withdrew, and FIFA offered the place to Portugal, the runner-up of Group 6, but they declined. FIFA decided not to allow anyone else to qualify, leaving the World Cup two teams short.

Group 3

First round 

Yugoslavia advanced to the Final Round.

Final round 

France 2–2 Yugoslavia on aggregate, and a play-off on neutral ground was played to decide who would qualify.

Yugoslavia qualified while France were also offered a place by FIFA. France initially accepted, but later declined.

Group 4

First round 

Switzerland advanced to the Final Round.

Final round 

Belgium withdrew, so Switzerland qualified automatically.

Group 5 

Sweden qualified. Finland withdrew before the group was completed. Ireland (FAI) were subsequently invited to enter competition but declined the opportunity because of travelling costs.

Sweden beat Finland 8–1 on 2 October 1949 in Malmö. However, FIFA's website does not include this match in the list of matches or in the group standings. RSSSF's website lists the match with the note "Sweden played B-team", and does not provide group standings.

Group 6 

Spain qualified. Portugal were also invited to take part but they declined.

Group 7 

Argentina withdrew, so Bolivia and Chile qualified automatically.

Group 8 

Ecuador and Peru withdrew, so Uruguay and Paraguay qualified automatically.

Group 9 

Mexico and the United States qualified.

Group 10 

Burma, Indonesia and the Philippines all withdrew before the draw, so India qualified automatically. But India later also withdrew "because of the expense of travelling such a long way to play," and the AIFF wanted to concentrate on the 1952 Olympics. Although according to some reports, it was caused by a FIFA ruling that players were not allowed to play barefoot. FIFA decided not to invite anyone else, leaving the World Cup three teams short.

Qualified teams 

,  and  withdrew after qualifying.
(H) – qualified automatically as hosts
(c) – qualified automatically as defending champions

Goalscorers

4 goals

 Jack Rowley
 Horacio Casarín
 Luis de la Fuente
 Željko Čajkovski

3 goals

 Jackie Milburn
 Stan Mortensen
 Sammy Smyth
 Con Martin
 Henry Morris
 Telmo Zarra
 Karl-Erik Palmér
 Jacques Fatton
 Fahrettin Cansever
 Stjepan Bobek
 Milutin Pajević

2 goals

 Stan Pearson
 Henri Baillot
 Yehoshua Glazer
 Antonio Flores
 Luis Luna
 José Naranjo
 William Waddell
 René Maillard
 Pete Matevich
 John Souza
 Frank Wallace
 Prvoslav Mihajlović
 Marko Valok

1 goal

 Jacinto Barquín
 José Gómez
 Santiago Veiga
 Roy Bentley
 Jack Froggatt
 Jorma Vaihela
 Jean Luciano
 Marius Walter
 Bobby Brennan
 Peter Farrell
 Johnny Gavin
 Davy Walsh
 Jim Kremer
 Armand Müller
 Michel Reuter
 Camille Wagner
 Mario Ochoa
 Héctor Ortiz
 Carlos Septién
 Fernando Cabrita
 António Jesus Correia
 José Travassos
 Alec Linwood
 Jimmy Mason
 John McPhail
 Lawrie Reilly
 Billy Steel
 Estanislau Basora
 Agustín Gaínza
 Luis Molowny
 José Luis Panizo
 Sune Anderson
 Hasse Jeppson
 Nils Liedholm
 Kiki Antenen
 Robert Ballaman
 Hans-Peter Friedländer
 Walter Bahr
 Ben Wattman
 Bülent Eken
 Erol Keskin
 Gündüz Kılıç
 Lefter Kücükandonyadis
 Mal Griffiths
 Zlatko Čajkovski
 Božidar Senčar

Notes 
 At the start of 1950 there were, in effect, two Ireland  teams, chosen by two rival associations. Both associations, the Northern Ireland-based IFA and the Republic of Ireland-based FAI claimed jurisdiction over the whole of Ireland and selected players from the whole island. As a result, several notable Irish players from this era played for both teams. Four players – Tom Aherne, Reg Ryan, Davy Walsh and Con Martin – actually played for both the FAI XI and the IFA XI in these qualifying rounds. FIFA intervened, after complaints from the FAI, and subsequently restricted players' eligibility based on the political border. In 1953 FIFA ruled neither team could be referred to as Ireland, decreeing that the FAI team be officially designated as the Republic of Ireland, while the IFA team was to become Northern Ireland.
 For the third qualifying tournament in a row, the South American teams qualified automatically after withdrawals. In Group 7, Bolivia and Chile did play two matches between them, but they were not classified as official World Cup qualifiers by FIFA.
 Burma, the Philippines and Indonesia all withdrew, so India qualified automatically. However, India withdrew later because of "disagreements over team selection and insufficient practice time.". India had never been able to qualify for the World Cup before and have never been able to do since then, which means they are the only team to have qualified for the World Cup and that never played a World Cup match.
 Germany and Japan were both banned because of their actions during World War II, Italy, despite originally being a member of the Axis powers, was allowed to participate because its government was overthrown in 1943 and the new government sided with the Allies.

References

External links 
 FIFA World Cup Official Site – 1950 World Cup Qualification
 RSSSF – 1950 World Cup Qualification
 All World Cup – 1950 World Cup Qualification

 
FIFA World Cup qualification